Jan van der Veen (born 6 July 1948) is a retired Dutch professional association football player who played for Sparta Rotterdam, Royal Antwerp, Go Ahead Eagles, Willem II and Helmond Sport. He also played in the NASL between 1978 and 1983 for the San Diego Sockers, Tampa Bay Rowdies and California Surf. Jan scored Tampa Bay's lone goal in the 22nd minute of Soccer Bowl '79 (NASL league final), which the Rowdies lost 2-1. He also played in the Major Indoor Soccer League for the Phoenix Inferno and the Wichita Wings.

References

External links
 NASL/MISL career stats
 Profile at Voetbal international
 Profile at R.A.F.C. museum

1948 births
Living people
Dutch footballers
Dutch expatriate footballers
Eredivisie players
Footballers from Rotterdam
Willem II (football club) players
Royal Antwerp F.C. players
Tampa Bay Rowdies (1975–1993) players
California Surf players
North American Soccer League (1968–1984) players
North American Soccer League (1968–1984) indoor players
San Diego Sockers (NASL) players
Major Indoor Soccer League (1978–1992) players
Phoenix Inferno players
Wichita Wings (MISL) players
Go Ahead Eagles players
Sparta Rotterdam players
Expatriate footballers in Belgium
Expatriate soccer players in the United States
Dutch expatriate sportspeople in Belgium
Dutch expatriate sportspeople in the United States
Association football midfielders